Gothic Revival architecture in Canada is an historically influential style, with many prominent examples. The Gothic Revival was imported to Canada from Britain and the United States in the early 19th century, and rose to become the most popular style for major projects throughout the late 19th and early 20th centuries.

The Gothic Revival period lasted longer and was more thoroughly embraced in Canada than in either Britain or the United States, only falling out of style in the 1930s. The late 19th and early 20th centuries was also the period when many major Canadian institutions were founded. Throughout Canada many of the most prominent religious, civic, and scholastic institutions are housed in Gothic Revival style buildings. In the 1960s and 1970s several scholars, most notably Alan Gowans, embraced Canadian Gothic Revival architecture as one of the nation's signature styles and as an integral part of Canadian nationalism. While largely abandoned in the modernist period, several postmodern architects have embraced Canada's neo-Gothic past.

History

Introduction to Canada

Gothic Architecture is a name given in retrospect to many of the major projects of the High Middle Ages. As this period covered the 13th and 14th centuries, there are no authentic Gothic buildings in Canada. The style was quite out of favour in the 17th century, when Europeans first began erecting structures in Canada, and the style is absent from the early settlements in New France and the Maritimes.

In the 18th century, a growing spirit of Romanticism and interest in the Medieval past led to a revival of Gothic styles in Britain. The style made its way to Canada in the early 19th century. One of the first appearances is in an 1811 proposal by Jeffry Wyatt for a new legislature in Quebec City. One of the first major Gothic Revival structures in Canada was Notre-Dame Basilica in Montreal, which was designed in 1824 by the Irish-American James O'Donnell. The largest church in North America upon its completion, it was one of the first architectural works of international note to be built in Canada. It was also one of the first Catholic Gothic Revival structures, as the movement would not spread from Britain to France and continental Europe until several years later. As the most prominent church in the colony its form was much imitated by local church builders, who constructed miniature versions of the basilica across Quebec.

Protestants also embraced the style. As early as the late 18th century, certain Gothic elements had appeared in a church in Nova Scotia, though the Georgian and Neo-classical styles remained dominant for several decades. The first stone neo-Gothic structure in the Maritimes is St. John's Church in Saint John, New Brunswick. It dates to 1824, the same year work began on Notre-Dame. In the 1830s and 1840s four prominent neo-Gothic Churches were built in Quebec City, representing each of that city's major Protestant denominations.

By the 1840s the Gothic Revival style had become virtually universal among Anglicans and used for most other Christian denominations as well. As in much of the English speaking world the lancet windows and buttresses of the Gothic Revival style soon became permanently associated in most people's mind with ecclesiastical buildings. It was soon also embraced for secular purposes as well, such as government buildings and universities. Canadian universities modeled themselves on the great British universities, Oxford and Cambridge, and this extended to embracing the Collegiate Gothic architecture used in their construction. Two of the first Gothic Revival colleges were Trinity College in Toronto and Bishop's University in Quebec.

Victorian High Gothic

In the later half of the 19th century, Gothic Revival architecture became the dominant style for major Canadian buildings. As the style became accepted and popular, architects became more willing to experiment and modify its conventions. While previous Gothic Revival architects had attempted to closely recapture the style of the Middle Ages, the new architects retained the Medieval motifs, but recombined them in entirely new ways.

One of the most important examples of this style anywhere in the world were the Parliament Buildings designed by Thomas Fuller. While the style and design of the building is unquestionably Gothic, it resembles no building constructed during the Middle Ages. The forms were the same, but their arrangement was uniquely modern. The Parliament Buildings also departed from Medieval models by integrating a variety of eras and styles of Gothic architecture, including elements of Gothic architecture from Britain, France, the Low Countries, and Italy all in one building.

In his Hand Book to the Parliamentary and Departmental Buildings, Canada (1867), Joseph Bureau wrote, "The style of the Buildings is the Gothic of the 12th and 13th Centuries, with modification to suit the climate of Canada. The ornamental work and the dressing round the windows are of Ohio sandstone. The plain surface is faced with a cream-colored sandstone of the Potsdam formation, obtained from Nepean, a few miles from Ottawa. The spandrils of the arches, and the spaces between window-arches and the sills of the upper windows, are filled up with a quaint description of stonework, composed of stones of irregular size, shape and colour, very neatly set together."

This style was also embraced for religious architecture. In most towns in Ontario, and also in many parts of the newly settled west and the Maritimes, elaborate High Gothic churches were built. Unlike in the earlier era, the French Catholic church in Quebec did not embrace this style. During this period the church leadership favoured a neo-baroque style more closely linked to the architecture of New France.

The Victorian High Gothic period also saw a willingness to combine the neo-Gothic with other styles. Two important examples of a mix between Gothic and Romanesque styles are University College in Toronto and the British Columbia Parliament Buildings. Variations on the neo-Gothic style developed in Britain were also imported to Canada. The Scottish baronial style was employed by Chief Dominion Architect David Ewart to create a number of castle like structures in Ottawa. New materials were also incorporated. Cast iron allowed stronger structures with thinner supporting walls to be built, while some recreated gothic forms in brick, rather than the traditional stone or wood.

One style that rose to special prominence was the Château Style of Canada's grand railway hotels, also known as Railway Gothic. This style first appeared in the late 19th century, with grandiose railway hotels such as the Château Frontenac and Banff Springs Hotel. It mixed Gothic Revival with elements borrowed from the castles of the Loire in France.

Architectural dominance

Gothic Revival became the dominant style of Canadian civic architecture largely as a matter of timing. The mid and late 19th century was the period that the Canadian state was formed and when many of its secular and religious institutions were established. Canadian Confederation occurred in 1867, and subsequent years saw a large construction programme as the government and civil service established itself in Ottawa and across the country. Rapid growth of cities, especially in Ontario, saw most Christian denominations in most cities build major churches during this period. The downtowns of most Canadian cities are thus dotted with Gothic Revival churches. Canada's historic secular institutions, such as universities and museums, were also founded in this era of rapid growth.

There are other reasons the Gothic styles became so widespread in Canada. The steep roofs and thick stone walls were well suited to Canada's northern climate. In the United States architects liked to link their republic to those of Ancient Greece and Rome through the neo-classical style. Canada's Loyalists had no such leanings, and the English-Canadian elite was strongly Anglophilic and monarchist. Gothic architecture was seen as symbolic of this. In the late 19th century as Canada began to see an influx of Southern and Eastern European immigrants, the nativist backlash also embraced Gothic Revival architecture as emblematic of Canada's identity as a homeland for the "northern race." In French Canada the civic and religious authorities of the 19th and early 20th century also embraced a strident conservatism.

While during this period the Gothic Revival style was almost universal among Christian religious buildings, it was less so among secular structures. Other revival styles were also popular. Romanesque Revival buildings were popular, as were neo-classical structures. No provincial legislature copied the style of the Parliament buildings. Even in Ottawa several federal government buildings of this period embraced other styles.

Pure Gothic forms were mostly unsuited to the day to day requirements of residential and commercial properties; however, neo-Gothic ornamentation and principles were successfully adapted to these uses, and these structures became quite popular in the late 19th and early 20th centuries. In rural areas the Gothic Cottage was immensely popular until well into the 20th century. Neighbourhoods that grew during this period, such as Cabbagetown and the Annex in Toronto, have many examples of houses that incorporate neo-Gothic elements. This includes a highly vertical emphasis on the structure; ornate decorations on the gables, often incorporating classic Gothic trefoil forms; and lancet windows and door frames. In rural Ontario the ubiquitous Ontario Cottage was often adorned with Gothic elements.

Modern Gothic

The Gothic Revival style started to wane in popularity in the late 19th century. New technologies such as steel building frames, elevators, and electric lighting were having a considerable impact on how buildings could be used and constructed. Newer styles such as the Beaux-Arts and Art Deco came to prominence. However, this was much less true in Canada. Gothic Revival architecture continued to be one of the most important building styles well into the 1940s, though often in highly modified and original forms. Just before the First World War Toronto saw work begin on three of its best known neo-Gothic structures, Casa Loma, the CHUM-City Building, and Hart House.  While the three buildings were erected for completely different purposes, and a very distinct in style, they are all clearly Gothic in inspiration.

In the years after the First World War, when the Gothic Revival was being supplanted in most of the world, Canada was also experiencing greatly strengthened Canadian nationalism. For the first time the Canadian political and cultural elite began to seek a path distinct from that being followed in the United Kingdom and United States. As so many notable Canadian structures were Gothic Revival in style it became closely linked to Canadian identity, and was embraced by the new Canadian nationalism.

Perhaps the most important Gothic Revival structure was the new Centre Block of the Canadian Parliament. The Gothic Revival monument of Thomas Fuller was destroyed by a fire in 1917. Despite the half a century that had elapsed since the first parliament was built, the Gothic Revival style was still the obvious choice to the Canadian Government. The new building had several important differences from the old one, most notably the new Peace Tower. The federal government continued building in the Gothic Revival style, of which long serving Prime Minister William Lyon Mackenzie King was a strong supporter, for several decades. As the federal government expanded, two major civil service office buildings were built in the Gothic style just to the west of Parliament Hill in the 1930s.

After the First World War some of the most prominent Gothic Revival structures were constructed by Canada's universities, in a style that is often known as Collegiate Gothic. The newer universities of western Canada, such as the University of British Columbia and University of Saskatchewan, turned to traditional styles as they underwent large expansions. The older universities of Ontario also built several new Gothic Revival Structures.

Gothic Revival finally almost completely disappeared after the Second World War, as Canada embraced Modern Architecture and the International Style. This was motivated by the prevailing fashion of the period, but also by economics and technology. The stark new structures of steel and glass were vastly cheaper than the often ornate stone constructions of the neo-Gothic style. The style thus almost completely disappeared.

The rise of postmodern architecture, with its interest in history and place, has seen the occasional reintegration of Gothic Revival styles. One example is Massey College at the University of Toronto. Its materials and the elements of its design are fully modern; however, the form and arrangement of those materials directly quotes from the Gothic Revival structures on campus. Another is the Windsor Arms Hotel, also in Toronto. It is a modern Gothic styled skyscraper built on the base of an older Gothic Revival structure from the start of the 20th century.

List of Gothic Revival buildings in Canada
Prominent Gothic Revival buildings across Canada listed by city.

Newfoundland and Labrador

Halifax

Rest of Nova Scotia

New Brunswick

Prince Edward Island

Quebec City

Montreal

Rest of Quebec

Ottawa

Kingston

Toronto

Hamilton

Rest of Ontario

Winnipeg

Saskatoon

Edmonton

Calgary

Vancouver

Victoria

Lost Buildings

 Wellesley Public School, Toronto - built at the corner of Bay and Wellesley Street in 1874 and demolished 1960s to make way for Sutton Place Hotel.

See also

Gothic Revival architecture
Canadian architecture
List of Gothic Revival architecture

References
 
"Victorian Gothic in Canada", by R.H. Hubbard. The Journal of the Society of Architectural Historians. Society of Architectural Historians, 1947.
"Canadian castles? The question of national styles in architecture revisited," by Thomas, Christopher. Journal of Canadian Studies,  Spring 1997
"Gothic Revival in Canadian Architecture," by Mathilde Brosseau. Occasional Papers in Archaeology and History. Canadian Historic Sites, 1980.
Kalman, Harold D. A History of Canadian Architecture. Toronto: Oxford University Press, 1994.
Canada by Design: Parliament Hill, Ottawa at Library and Archives Canada
'Gothic Dreams: The Architecture of William Critchlow Harris 1954-1913', by Rev. Robert C. Tuck pub. 1995 by the Confederation Centre Art Gallery in Charlottetown.
 'Parisian Gothic': Interpretations of Gothic in Three Victorian Buildings in Paris, Ontario' by M. Thurlby in Journal of the Society for the Study of Architecture in Canada, xxxiv, No. 1, Spring 2009, 22-8, illus.
 'St. Mary's Halifax: An early Example of the Use of Gothic Revival Forms in Canada' by J. Philip McAleer in Journal of the Society of Architectural Historians, xlv, June 1986, 134-6; E. Pacey, Historic Halifax, 1988 100-01, illus.

External
 Biographical Dictionary of Architects in Canada 1800-1950 -'Gothic Revival'